Microseris heterocarpa, known by the common name grassland silverpuffs, is a species of flowering plant in the family Asteraceae.

Distribution
It is native to southwestern North America, where it can be found in various areas of California, and parts of  Arizona and northern Mexico. It grows in open habitat in chaparral, woodlands, grasslands, desert, Sierra foothill, and inland canyons.

This species is also found on Guadalupe Island, a Mexican island in the Pacific Ocean.

Description
Microseris heterocarpa is variable in morphology. In general, it is an annual herb with a basal rosette of large leaves. The inflorescence arises on a tall peduncle bearing a solitary flower head. The head is lined in hairless phyllaries and contains many ray florets, often over 100, in shades of yellow or white.

The fruit is an achene with a brown, gray, blue, or purple body tipped with a pappus of five long, spreading scales, the whole unit measuring 1 or 2 centimeters.

This species is suspected to be a hybrid between Microseris douglasii and Uropappus lindleyi which may have evolved independently, possibly three times. The plant comes in a wide variety of appearances with variations in florescence properties and size, as well as height, ranging on a scale between both of the suspected parent taxa.

References

External links
Jepson Manual Treatment - Stebbinsoseris heterocarpa
USDA Plants Profile
Stebbinsoseris heterocarpa - Photo gallery

Cichorieae
Flora of Northwestern Mexico
Flora of Arizona
Flora of the Sierra Nevada (United States)
Flora of Mexican Pacific Islands
Flora of California
Flora of the California desert regions
Natural history of the Central Valley (California)
Natural history of the California Coast Ranges
Flora without expected TNC conservation status